19th Regiment or 19th Infantry Regiment may refer to:

Infantry regiments
 Green Howards (19th Regiment of Foot), a unit of the British Army
 Kumaon Regiment (19th Hyderabad Regiment), a unit of the British India and Indian Armies
 Norrbottens regemente (19th Regiment, Sweden), one of two Swedish regiments to bear this designation
 Västerbottens regemente (19th Regiment, Sweden), one of two Swedish regiments to bear this designation
 19th Infantry Regiment (United States), a unit of the United States Army

Cavalry regiments
 4th/19th Prince of Wales's Light Horse, a unit of the Australian Army
 19th King George's Own Lancers, a unit of the British Indian Army
 19th Alberta Dragoons, a unit of the Canadian Army
 19th Light Dragoons, a unit of the British Army 
 19th Royal Hussars, a unit of the British Army
 15th/19th The King's Royal Hussars, a unit of the British Army

Artillery regiments
 19th Regiment Royal Artillery, a unit of the British Army

Aviation regiments
 Flying Regiment 19, Finnish Air Force, a unit of the Finnish Air Force

American Civil War regiments
 19th Regiment Alabama Infantry, a unit of the Confederate (South) Army
 19th Tennessee Infantry Regiment, a unit of the Confederate (South) Army
 19th Illinois Volunteer Infantry Regiment, a unit of the Union (North) Army 
 19th Indiana Volunteer Infantry Regiment, a unit of the Union (North) Army
 19th Iowa Volunteer Infantry Regiment, a unit of the Union (North) Army 
 19th Maine Volunteer Infantry Regiment, a unit of the Union (North) Army
 19th Michigan Volunteer Infantry Regiment, a unit of the Union (North) Army 
 19th Wisconsin Volunteer Infantry Regiment, a unit of the Union (North) Army
 19th United States Colored Infantry Regiment, a unit of the Union (North) Army

See also
 19th Corps (disambiguation)
 19th Division (disambiguation)
 19th Brigade (disambiguation)
 19th Group (disambiguation)
 19th Battalion (disambiguation)
 19th Squadron (disambiguation)